Michelle Hampson is an American neuroscientist who is an Associate Professor of Radiology and Biomedical Imaging at Yale University. She serves as director of real-time functional magnetic resonance imaging.

Early life and education 

Hampson studied computer science at the University of Alberta. She moved to Boston University for her doctoral research, working on the computational modelling of neural networks. Hampson joined Yale University as a postdoctoral researcher. Her postdoctoral research involved some of the first studies of the functional connectivity in the resting state. She mapped the functional connectivity of the resting state to different behavioural variables. During her postdoc she started working with real time functional magnetic resonance imaging (fMRI). In particular, Hampson was interested in whether fMRI neurofeedback could be used to help people control their brain activity.

Research and career 
Hampson was appointed to the faculty of Yale University in 2002, where she develops real-time (rt) fMRI for the treatment of mental and neurological conditions. Amongst these conditions, Hampson has shown that neurofeedback achieved with rt-fMRI can be used to help people with obsessive–compulsive disorder, Tourette syndrome and post-traumatic stress disorder. In patients with extreme anxiety, making use of neurofeedback to visualize and control activity in the orbitofrontal cortex was shown to be an effective treatment. For patients with post-traumatic stress disorder, Hampson explored whether it is possible to control activity in the amygdala when recalling trauma.

Hampsonwrote the Elsevier textbook fMRI Neurofeedback in 2021.

Selected publications

References 

Living people
Year of birth missing (living people)
Boston University alumni
University of Alberta alumni
Yale University faculty
American neuroscientists
American women neuroscientists
21st-century American women